Norcia, traditionally known in English by its Latin name of Nursia, is a town and comune in the province of Perugia (Italy) in southeastern Umbria. Unlike many ancient towns, it is located in a wide plain abutting the Monti Sibillini, a subrange of the Apennines with some of its highest peaks, near the Sordo River, a small stream that eventually flows into the Nera. The town is popularly associated with the Valnerina (the valley of that river).

The area is known for its air and scenery, and is a base for mountaineering and hiking. It is also widely known for hunting, especially of the wild boar, and for sausages and ham made from wild boar and pork. Such products have been named after Norcia; in Italian, they are called norcineria.

History 
Traces of human settlement in Norcia's area date back to the Neolithic Age.

The town's known history begins with settlement by the Sabines in the 5th century BC. After the conquest by the Romans in the 3rd century BC, it was an ally of ancient Rome in 205 BC, during the Second Punic War, when it was known in Latin as Nursia, but the earliest extant Roman ruins date from around the 1st century. The renegade general Quintus Sertorius, who famously fought a guerrilla war in Spain against the Roman government (80–72 BC), was born in Nursia in c. 123 BC. Another famous Nursian of Roman times was Vespasia Polla (born c. 15 BC), the mother of the emperor Vespasian.

St. Benedict, the founder of the Benedictine monastic system, and his twin sister St. Scholastica, were born here in AD 480. In the 8th century, an oratory was built so pilgrims could pray at St. Benedict's birthplace. Monks came to Norcia in the 10th century. Contemporary monks care for the Monastery of St. Benedict, built over the Roman ruins of the house of Sts. Benedict and Scholastica.

In the 6th century Norcia was conquered by the Lombards, becoming part of the Duchy of Spoleto. In the 9th century it suffered from Saracen attacks, which started a period of deep decadence. In the 11th century, it was part of the domain of St. Henry, Holy Roman Emperor. In the 12th century Norcia became an independent commune within the Papal territories, with an increasing political and economical prestige. The collaboration with the Benedictine abbey in Preci led to the creation of the Schola Chirurgica. Studies at this institution contributed to Norcia residents improving their swine breeding. The powerful Spoleto and the 1324 earthquake thwarted the city's ambitions, and in 1354 it was returned definitively to the Papal authority.

On 24 August 2016, a magnitude 6.2 earthquake and numerous strong aftershocks struck near Norcia, causing major damage to the towns in the region. The people in the town of Norcia were not injured. The town of Norcia itself only suffered structural damage but this displaced many citizens. However, several small towns around the town received heavy damage and many collapsed buildings.

On 30 October 2016, another magnitude 6.5 earthquake rocked Norcia, causing heavy damage to the city: among other buildings, the Basilica of St. Benedict was destroyed.

Main sights 
The older core of Norcia is almost flat, which is relatively unusual among the towns of Umbria. It is completely enclosed by a full circuit of walls that has survived intact from the 14th century. They stood up despite many earthquakes, of which several were devastating (1763, 1859, 1979).  After the earthquake of 22 August 1859, the Papal States, to which Norcia then belonged, imposed a stringent construction code forbidding structures of more than three storeys and requiring the use of certain materials and building techniques.

Roman vestiges are observable throughout the city, especially in the walls of San Lorenzo, its oldest extant church. On via Umberto is a small aedicule or corner chapel, sometimes called a tempietto, with faded frescoes, painted by Vanni della Tuccia in 1354. Of greater interest are the two Romanesque arches, densely sculpted with zoomorphic, human, and geometric forms.

The main basilica is dedicated to St. Benedict and is connected to a functioning Benedictine monastery, the Monastery of St. Benedict.  Though this edifice was built in the 13th century, it stood on the remains of one or more small Roman buildings, sometimes considered to have been a Roman basilica, or alternately the house in which the twin saints were born. The façade, in Gothic style, is characterized by a central rose window and relief portraying the four Evangelists. Inside, the fresco of the Resurrection of Lazarus (1560) was painted by Michelangelo Carducci. The altar in the left-hand transept housed a St Benedict and Totila (1621) by Filippo Napoletano. The basilica  was destroyed by an earthquake on 30 October 2016.

The Renaissance church of Santa Maria Argentea is the Duomo or cathedral. It holds some works by Flemish masters, a richly decorated altar by Duquesnoy, a Madonna and Saints by Pomarancio, and a St Vicent Ferrer and the Sick (1756) by Giuseppe Paladini.

The Gothic church of Sant'Agostino (14th century) has many votive frescoes of St Roch and St Sebastian. San Francesco, from the same century has a notable portal, surmounted by a Gothic rose window, with pink and white stone decorations.

A fortress, the Castellina was built in 1555–1563 as the residence of the Papal governors, as designed by Giacomo Barozzi da Vignola. It now houses a small museum with Roman and medieval artifacts, and documents of the Middle Ages and later periods.

In the frazioni near the town proper, are
The pieve of San Salvatore, at Campi, with two rose windows and two portals of different ages. Also in Campi is the parish church of St. Andrew, with an original triangular loggiato. The Church of San Salvatore and that of Sant'Andrea were damaged or destroyed in the 2016 earthquake.
The frazione of Savelli has the ruins of Madonna della Neve, an elegant octagonal church designed by Bramante in the 15th century. It was destroyed by the 1979 earthquake.
In San Pellegrino is the convent of Santa Maria di Montesanto (14th century), now in poor condition. It has a noteworthy cloister and a church with 17th-century canvasses and a 14th-century wooden statue, Madonna with Child.

On 30 October 2016, a 6.6 magnitude earthquake with an epicenter near Norcia destroyed the basilica of St. Benedict Church as well as the town's cathedral, with only the facade remaining.

Frazioni
Agriano, Aliena, Ancarano, Biselli, Campi, Casali di Serravalle, Case sparse, Castelluccio, Cortigno, Forca Canapine, Forsivo, Frascaro, Legogne, Monte-Cappelletta, Nottoria, Ocricchio, Ospedaletto, Pescia, Pie' la rocca, Piediripa, Popoli, San Marco, San Pellegrino, Sant'Andrea, Savelli, Serravalle, Valcaldara.

Serravalle (also known as Serravalle di Norcia) lies on the Sordo River a few hundred meters upstream from its confluence with the Corno.

See also
1703 Apennine earthquakes
October 2016 Central Italy earthquakes

References

External links

Official website 
Monastery of St. Benedict
Information about Norcia 
Storia e informazioni su Norcia 
Norcia.Net Town's tourist site 
UmbriaTurismo 
Norcia – Bella Umbria
Bill Thayer's site

 
Roman sites of Umbria
Cities and towns in Umbria
Castles in Italy